Trevor Corson is a writer, and author of the books The Secret Life of Lobsters and The Story of Sushi.

Corson spent two years studying philosophy in China, three years in Japan living in temples and studying Buddhism, and two years working as a commercial lobsterman off the Maine coast. As a journalist Corson has written about food, religion, foreign affairs, medicine, and a wide variety of other topics for The New York Times, The Wall Street Journal, the Los Angeles Times, The Boston Globe, and The Atlantic Monthly.

Corson was the managing editor of the literary magazine Transition, edited by Professor Henry Louis Gates, Jr. at Harvard University, during the years it won three consecutive Alternative Press Awards for International Reporting and was nominated for a National Magazine Award in General Excellence.

Corson's first book, The Secret Life of Lobsters, began as an Atlantic Monthly centerpiece article that was included in The Best American Science Writing. The Secret Life of Lobsters was named a best nature book of the year by USA Today and Discover, a best book of the year by Time Out New York, and went on to become an Amazon worldwide bestseller in the popular-science category.

Corson's second book, The Story of Sushi: An Unlikely Saga of Raw Fish and Rice (originally titled The Zen of Fish in hardcover), was selected as an Editors’ Choice by the New York Times Book Review; it also won “Best American Food Literature Book” of 2007 in the Gourmand World Cookbook Awards and was selected as a Best Food Book of the Year by Zagat.

Corson is a frequent public speaker and his work has been featured on CBS Sunday Morning, ABC World News with Charles Gibson, NPR’s All Things Considered and Talk of the Nation, WNYC's Radiolab, as well as numerous local television and radio programs; he has also appeared on the Food Network’s hit TV show Iron Chef America and has blogged for The Atlantic.

Corson is a recipient of a Japanese Ministry of Education Fellowship, has been a Knight Fellow at M.I.T. in the Investigative Science Journalism Boot Camp, and was a Visiting Writer at the University of Memphis. He is a co-author of the Blue Ocean Institute’s Guide to Ocean-Friendly Sushi and has been nominated for a 2010 “Seafood Champion” award from the Seafood Choices Alliance for his focus on sustainable ocean harvesting.

Corson has also written about the relationship between socialism and capitalism in Finland for the New York Times and about social services in Finland for the Christian Science Monitor, among other topics.

In 2010 he taught at The New School in the Foreign Languages program and from 2011 to 2013, he developed an Asian Studies program at Brooklyn Friends School and taught in both the World Languages and the History Departments. In 2016 he taught science writing in the graduate program in Science and Medical Journalism at the Boston University College of Communication.

From 2014 to 2016, Corson completed an MFA in creative writing at Columbia University while serving as a Teaching Fellow in the Undergraduate Writing Program there. Corson subsequently served as Lecturer & Course Co-Director in American Studies in Columbia's Undergraduate Writing Program. He was also an adjunct assistant professor in the graduate nonfiction creative writing program in the Columbia University School of the Arts.

Personal life
Corson is married to Finnish journalist Anu Partanen. They moved to Finland in 2018.

Books

Journalism

References

External links
 Trevor Corson's official website

Living people
American male journalists
Columbia University School of the Arts alumni
Year of birth missing (living people)
American expatriates in Finland